The 1980 Turkish coup d'état, headed by Chief of the General Staff General Kenan Evren, was the third coup d'état in the history of the Republic of Turkey, the previous having been the 1960 coup and the 1971 coup by memorandum. 

During the Cold War era, Turkey saw political violence (1976–1980) between far-left, far-right (Grey Wolves), Islamist militant groups, and the state. The violence saw a sharp downturn for a period after the coup, which was welcomed by some for restoring order by quickly executing 50 people and arresting 500,000 of which hundreds would die in prison.

For the next three years the Turkish Armed Forces ruled the country through the National Security Council, before democracy was restored with the 1983 Turkish general election. This period saw an intensification of the Turkish nationalism of the state, including banning the Kurdish language.  Turkey partially returned to democracy in 1983 and fully in 1989.

Prelude

The 1970s in Turkey was characterized by political turmoil and violence. Since 1968–69, a proportional representation system had made it difficult for any one party to achieve a parliamentary majority. The interests of the industrial bourgeoisie, which held the largest holdings of the country, were opposed by other social classes such as smaller industrialists, traders, rural notables, and landlords, whose interests did not always coincide among themselves. Numerous agricultural and industrial reforms sought by parts of the middle upper classes were blocked by others. 
By the end of the 1970s, Turkey was in an unstable situation with unsolved economic and social problems, facing strike actions, and the partial paralysis of parliamentary politics. The Grand National Assembly of Turkey had been unable to elect a president during the six months preceding the coup. 

In 1975 conservative Justice Party leader Süleyman Demirel was succeeded as Prime Minister by the leader of the social-democratic Republican People's Party, Bülent Ecevit.

Demirel formed a coalition with the Nationalist Front, the National Salvation Party (an Islamist party led by Necmettin Erbakan), and the far-right Nationalist Movement Party led by Alparslan Türkeş. 

The MHP used the opportunity to infiltrate state security services, seriously aggravating the low-intensity war between the rival factions. Politicians seemed unable to stem the growing violence in the country.

The elections of 1977 had no winner. At first, Demirel continued the coalition with the Nationalist Front. But in 1978, Ecevit once again took power with the help of some deputies who had moved from one party to another, until 1979, when Demirel once again became Prime Minister.

Unprecedented political violence erupted in Turkey in the late 1970s. The overall death toll of the 1970s is estimated at 5,000, with nearly ten assassinations per day. Most were members of left-wing and right-wing political organizations, then engaged in bitter fighting. The ultra-nationalist Grey Wolves, the youth organisation of the MHP, claimed they were supporting the security forces. According to the anti-fascist Searchlight magazine, in 1978 there were 3,319 fascist attacks, in which 831 were killed and 3,121 wounded. 

In the central trial against the radical left-wing organization Devrimci Yol (Revolutionary Path) at Ankara Military Court, the defendants listed 5,388 political killings before the military coup. Among the victims were 1,296 right-wingers and 2,109 left-wingers. Other killings couldn't be definitely connected, but were most likely politically inspired. The 1977 Taksim Square massacre, the 1978 Bahçelievler massacre, and the 1978 Maraş massacre stood out. Following the Maraş massacre, martial law was announced in 14 of (then) 67 provinces in December 1978. By the time of the coup, it had been extended to 20 provinces.

Ecevit was warned about the coming coup in June 1979 by Nuri Gündeş of the National Intelligence Organization , (MİT)). Ecevit told his interior minister, İrfan Özaydınlı, who then passed the news on to Sedat Celasun—one of the five generals who would lead the coup. (The deputy undersecretary of the MİT, Nihat Yıldız, was demoted to the London consulate and replaced by a lieutenant general as a result).

Coup

On 11 September 1979, General Kenan Evren ordered a hand-written report from full general Haydar Saltık on whether a coup was in order or the government merely needed a stern warning. The report, which recommended preparing for a coup, was delivered in six months. Evren kept the report in his office safe. Evren says the only other person beside Saltık who was aware of the details was Nurettin Ersin. It has been argued that this was a ploy on Evren's part to encompass the political spectrum as Saltık was close to the left, while Ersin took care of the right. Backlash from political organizations after the coup would therefore be prevented.

On 21 December, the War Academy generals convened to decide the course of action. The pretext for the coup was to put an end to the social conflicts of the 1970s, as well as the parliamentary instability. They resolved to issue the party leaders (Süleyman Demirel and Bülent Ecevit) a memorandum by way of the president, Fahri Korutürk, which was done on 27 December. The leaders received the letter a week later.

A second report, submitted in March 1980, recommended undertaking the coup without further delay, otherwise apprehensive lower-ranked officers might be tempted to "take the matter into their own hands". Evren made only minor amendments to Saltık's plan, titled "Operation Flag".

The coup was planned to take place on 11 July 1980, but was postponed after a motion to put Demirel's government to a vote of confidence was rejected on 2 July. At the Supreme Military Council meeting on 26 August, a second date was proposed: 12 September.

On 7 September 1980, Evren and the four service commanders decided that they would overthrow the civilian government. On 12 September, the National Security Council (MGK), headed by Evren declared coup d'état on the national channel. The MGK then extended martial law throughout the country, abolished the Parliament and the government, suspended the Constitution and banned all political parties and trade unions. They invoked the Kemalist tradition of state secularism and in the unity of the nation, which had already justified the precedent coups, and presented themselves as opposed to communism, fascism, separatism and religious sectarianism.

The nation learned of the coup at 4:30 AM on the state radio address announcing that the parliament had been dismissed and that the country was under the control of the Turkish Armed Forces. According to the Armed Forces broadcast, the coup was needed to save the Turkish Republic from political fragmentation, violence and the economic collapse that was created by political mismanagement. Kenan Evren was appointed head of the National Security Council.

Effects

In the days following the coup the NSC suspended parliament, disbanded all political parties and took their leaders in custody. Workers' strikes were made illegal and labor unions were suspended. Local governors, mayors and public servants were replaced by military personnel. Curfews were imposed in the evenings under the declared state of emergency and leaving the country was prohibited. By the end of 1982 over 120,000 people had been imprisoned.

Istanbul was served by three military mayors between 1980 and 1984. They renamed the leftist shantytowns changing names like "1 Mayıs Mahallesi" (Eng.: "1st of May Neighborhood") to "Mustafa Kemal Mahallesi" (Eng.: "Mustafa Kemal Neighborhood"), as a symbol of the military rule.

Economy
One of the coup's most visible effects was on the economy. On the day of the coup, it was on the verge of collapse, with three digit inflation. There was large-scale unemployment, and a chronic foreign trade deficit. The economic changes between 1980 and 1983 were credited to Turgut Özal, who was the main person responsible for the economic policy by the Demirel Destined administration since 24 January 1980. Özal supported the IMF, and to this end he forced the resignation of the director of the Central Bank, İsmail Aydınoğlu, who opposed it.

The strategic aim was to unite Turkey with the "global economy," which big business supported, and gave Turkish companies the ability to market products and services globally. One month after the coup, London's International Banking Review wrote "A feeling of hope is evident among international bankers that Turkey's military coup may have opened the way to greater political stability as an essential prerequisite for the revitalization of the Turkish economy". During 1980–1983, the foreign exchange rate was allowed to float freely. Foreign investment was encouraged. The national establishments, initiated by Atatürk's Reforms, were promoted to involve joint enterprises with foreign establishments. The 85% pre-coup level government involvement in the economy forced a reduction in the relative importance of the state sector. Just after the coup, Turkey revitalized the Atatürk Dam and the Southeastern Anatolia Project, which was a land reform project promoted as a solution to the underdeveloped Southeastern Anatolia. It was transformed into a multi-sector social and economic development program, a sustainable development program, for the 9 million people of the region. The closed economy, produced for only Turkey's need, was subsidized for a vigorous export drive.

The drastic expansion of the economy during this period was relative to the previous level. The GDP remained well below those of most Middle Eastern and European countries. The government froze wages while the economy experienced a significant decrease of the public sector, a deflationist policy, and several successive mini-devaluations.

Tribunals
The coup rounded up members of both the left and right for trial with military tribunals. Within a very short time, there were 250,000 to 650,000 people detained. Among the detainees, 230,000 were tried, 14,000 were stripped of citizenship, and 50 were executed. In addition, hundreds of thousands of people were tortured, and thousands disappeared. A total of 1,683,000 people were blacklisted. Apart from the militants killed during shootings, at least four prisoners were legally executed immediately after the coup; the first ones since 1972, while in February 1982 there were 108 prisoners condemned to capital punishment. Among the prosecuted were Ecevit, Demirel, Türkeş, and Erbakan, who were incarcerated and temporarily suspended from politics.

One notable victim of the hangings was a 17-year-old Erdal Eren, who said he looked forward to it in order to avoid thinking of the torture he had witnessed.

After having taken advantage of the Grey Wolves' activism, General Kenan Evren imprisoned hundreds of them. At the time they were some 1700 Grey Wolves organizations in Turkey, with about 200,000 registered members and a million sympathizers. In its indictment of the MHP in May 1981, the Turkish military government charged 220 members of the MHP and its affiliates for 694 murders. Evren and his cohorts realized that Türkeş was a charismatic leader who could challenge their authority using the paramilitary Grey Wolves. Following the coup in Colonel Türkeş's indictment, the Turkish press revealed the close links maintained by the MHP with security forces as well as organized crime involved in drug trade, which financed in return weapons and the activities of hired fascist commandos all over the country.

Constitution
Within three years the generals passed some 800 laws in order to form a militarily disciplined society. The coup members were convinced of the unworkability of the existing constitution. They decided to adopt a new constitution that included mechanisms to prevent what they saw as impeding the functioning of democracy. On 29 June 1981 the military junta appointed 160 people as members of an advisory assembly to draft a new constitution. The new constitution brought clear limits and definitions, such as on the rules of election of the president, which was stated as a factor for the coup d'état.

On 7 November 1982 the new constitution was put to a referendum, which was accepted with 92% of the vote. On 9 November 1982 Kenan Evren was appointed President for the next seven years.

Result

 650,000 people were under arrest.
 1,683,000 people were blacklisted.
 230,000 people were tried in 210,000 lawsuits.
 7,000 people were recommended for the death penalty.
 517 people were sentenced to death.
 50 of those given the death penalty were executed (26 political prisoners, 23 criminal offenders and 1 ASALA militant).
 The files of 259 people, which had been recommended for the death penalty, were sent to the National Assembly.
 71,000 people were tried by articles 141, 142 and 163 of Turkish Penal Code.
 98,404 people were tried on charges of being members of a leftist, a rightist, a nationalist, a conservative, etc. organization.
 388,000 people were denied a passport.
 30,000 people were dismissed from their firms because they were suspects.
 14,000 people had their citizenship revoked.
 30,000 people went abroad as political refugees.
 300 people died in a suspicious manner.
 171 people died by reason of torture.
 937 films were banned because they were found objectionable.
 23,677 associations had their activities stopped.
 3,854 teachers, 120 lecturers and 47 judges were dismissed.
 400 journalists were sentenced to 3,315 years and 6 months imprisonment, and 31 journalists were actually imprisoned.
 300 journalists were attacked.
 3 journalists were shot dead.
 300 days in which newspapers were not published.
 303 cases were opened for 13 major newspapers.
 39 tonnes of newspapers and magazines were destroyed.
 299 people lost their lives in prison.
 144 people died in a suspicious manner in prison.
 14 people died in hunger strikes in prison.
 16 people were shot while fleeing.
 95 people were killed in combat.
 "Natural death report" for 73 persons was given.
 The cause of death of 43 people was announced as "suicide".

Source: The Grand National Assembly of Turkey (Turkish: Turkiye Buyuk Millet Meclisi – TBMM)

Aftermath
After the approval by referendum of the new Constitution in June 1982, Kenan Evren organized general elections, held on 6 November 1983. This democratization has been criticized by the Turkish scholar Ergun Özbudun as a "textbook case" of a junta's dictating the terms of its departure.

The referendum and the elections did not take place in a free and competitive setting. Many political leaders of pre-coup era (including Süleyman Demirel, Bülent Ecevit, Alparslan Türkeş and Necmettin Erbakan) had been banned from politics, and all new parties needed to get the approval of the National Security Council in order to participate in the elections. Only three parties, two of which were actually created by the junta, were permitted to contest.

The secretary general of the National Security Council was general Haydar Saltık. Both he and Evren were the strong men of the regime, while the government was headed by a retired admiral, Bülend Ulusu, and included several retired military officers and a few civil servants. Some alleged in Turkey, after the coup, that General Saltuk had been preparing a more radical, rightist coup, which had been one of the reasons prompting the other generals to act, respecting the hierarchy, and then to include him in the MGK in order to neutralize him.

Out of the 1983 elections came one-party governance under Turgut Özal's Motherland Party, which combined a neoliberal economic program with conservative social values.

Yildirim Akbulut became the head of the Parliament. He was succeeded in 1991 by Mesut Yılmaz. Meanwhile, Süleyman Demirel founded the center-right True Path Party in 1983, and returned to active politics after the 1987 Turkish referendum.

Yılmaz redoubled Turkey's economic profile, converting towns like Gaziantep from small provincial capitals into mid-sized economic boomtowns, and renewed its orientation toward Europe. But political instability followed as the host of banned politicians reentered politics, fracturing the vote, and the Motherland Party became increasingly corrupt. Ozal, who succeeded Evren as President of Turkey, died of a heart attack in 1993, and Süleyman Demirel was elected president.

The Özal government empowered the police force with intelligence capabilities to counter the National Intelligence Organization, which at the time was run by the military. The police force even engaged in external intelligence collection.

Trial of coup leaders
After the 2010 referendum, an investigation was started regarding the coup, and in June 2011, the Specially Authorized Ankara Deputy Prosecutor's Office asked ex-prosecutor  to forward a copy of an indictment he had prepared for Kenan Evren. Kayasu had previously been fired for trying to indict Evren in 2003.

In January 2012, a Turkish court accepted the indictments against General Kenan Evren and General Tahsin Şahinkaya, the only coup leaders still alive at the time, for their role in the coup. Prosecutors sought life sentences against the two retired generals. According to the indictment, a total of 191 people died in custody during the aftermath of the coup, due to "inhumane" acts. The trial began on 4 April 2012. In 2012, a court case was launched against Şahinkaya and Kenan Evren relating to the 1980 military coup. Both were sentenced to life imprisonment on 18 June 2014 by a court in Ankara. But neither of the two was sent to prison as both were in hospitals for medical treatment. Şahinkaya died in the Gülhane Military Medical Academy Hospital (GATA) in Haydarpaşa, Istanbul on 9 July 2015. Evren died at a military hospital in Ankara on 9 May 2015, aged 97. His sentence was on appeal at the time of his death.

Allegations of US involvement
Apart from a few dubious anecdotes, there is no evidence of American involvement in the coup. The involvement was alleged to have been acknowledged by the CIA Ankara station chief Paul B. Henze. In his 1986 book "12 Eylül: saat 04.00" journalist Mehmet Ali Birand wrote that after the government was overthrown, Henze cabled Washington, saying, "our boys did it." On a June 2003 interview to Zaman, Henze denied American involvement stating "I did not say to Carter "Our boys did it." It is totally a tale, a myth, It is something Birand fabricated. He knows it, too. I talked to him about it". Two days later Birand replied on CNN Türk's Manşet by saying "It is impossible for me to have fabricated it, the American support to the coup and the atmosphere in Washington was in the same direction. Henze narrated me these words despite he now denies it" and presented the footage of an interview with Henze recorded in 1997 according to which another diplomat rather than Henze informed the president, saying "Boys in Ankara did it."  However, according to the same interview, Hanze, the CIA and the Pentagon did not know about the coup beforehand. Some Turkish media sources reported it as "Henze indeed said Our boys did it", while others simply called the statement an urban legend.

The US State Department itself announced the coup during the night between 11 and 12 September: the military had phoned the US embassy in Ankara to alert them of the coup an hour in advance. Both in his press conference held after the government was overthrown and when interrogated by public prosecutor in 2011 General Kenan Evren said "the US did not have pre-knowledge of the coup but we informed them of the coup 2 hours in advance due to our soldiers coinciding with the American community JUSMAT that is in Ankara."

Tahsin Şahinkaya –  then general in charge of the Turkish Air Forces who is said to have travelled to the United States just before the coup, told the US army general was not informed of the upcoming coup and the general was surprised to have been uninformed of the coup after the government was overthrown.

In culture

The coup has been criticised in many Turkish movies, TV series and songs since 1980.

Movies
 1986 –  (Şerif Gören)
 1986 –  (Zeki Alasya)
 1986 – Prenses (Sinan Çetin)
 1986 – Ses (Zeki Ökten)
 1987 – Hunting Time (Av Zamanı) (Erden Kıral)
 1987 – Kara Sevdalı Bulut
 1988 – Sis (Zülfü Livaneli)
 1988 – 
 1989 –  (Memduh Ün)
 1989 – Uçurtmayı Vurmasınlar (Tunç Başaran)
 1990 –  (Atıf Yılmaz)
 1991 – 
 1994 –  (Handan İpekçi)
 1995 –  (Tomris Giritlioğlu)
 1998 – 
 1999 –  (Atıf Yılmaz)
 2000 – Coup/Darbe - A Documentary History of the Turkish Military Interventions (Documentary, Elif Savaş Felsen)
 2005 – Babam ve Oğlum (Çağan Irmak)
 2006 – Beynelmilel (Sırrı Süreyya Önder)
 2006 – Home Coming (Eve Dönüş)
 2007 – Zincirbozan  (Atıl İnaç)
 2008 – O... Çocukları (Murat Saraçoğlu)
 2010 – September 12 (Özlem Sulak)
 2015 –  2015 – Kar Korsanlari 2015 – KafesTelevision series
 2004 –  2007 – Hatırla Sevgili 2009 –  2012 – Seksenler 2010 – Öyle Bir Geçer Zaman Ki''

Music
 Cem Karaca (1992), maNga (2006), Ayben (2008), 'Raptiye Rap Rap' (1992)
 Fikret Kızılok 'Demirbaş' (1995)
 Grup Yorum: Büyü – (Composed in memory of Erdal Eren)
 Hasan Mutlucan, 'Yine de Şahlanıyor'
 Mor ve Ötesi, 'Darbe' (2006)
 Ozan Arif, Yaşıyor Kenan Paşa
 Ozan Arif, 'Seksenciler'
 Ozan Arif, 'Muhasebe'(12 Eylül)
 Ozan Arif, Bir İt Vardı
 Sexen, A.D. 12 September Listen
 Sexen, Censored Inc. (Album, 2009) Listen
 Sezen Aksu, 'Son Bakış' (1989)
 Suavi 'Eylül' (1996)
 Teoman and Yavuz Bingöl, 'İki Çocuk' (2006)
 Özdemir Erdoğan, 'Gurbet Türküsü'
 Ezginin Günlüğü, '1980'
 Kramp, 'Lan N'oldu?'

See also

 1960 Turkish coup d'état
 1971 Turkish military memorandum
 1997 Turkish military memorandum
 2016 Turkish coup d'état attempt
 Diyarbakır Prison
 History of Turkey
 List of modern conflicts in the Middle East

References

Bibliography

 
 

Conflicts in 1980
Military coups in Turkey
Coup d'etat
Turkey, 1980
1980s coups d'état and coup attempts
September 1980 events in Europe
Economic history of Turkey
Anti-communism in Turkey